The 2017–18 season is Eastern's 63rd season in the top-tier division in Hong Kong football. Eastern will compete in the Premier League, Senior Challenge Shield, FA Cup and Sapling Cup in this season.

Current squad
 As 11 July 2017.

First team

Reserves

Competitions

Hong Kong Premier League

Table

Results by round

Results summary

League Matches

Hong Kong FA Cup

Hong Kong Senior Challenge Shield

Hong Kong Sapling Cup

Statistics

Appearances and goals

Goalscorers

Disciplinary record

References

Eastern Sports Club seasons
Hong Kong football clubs 2017–18 season